Juan Núñez de Lara may refer to:

 Juan Núñez I de Lara the Fat (died 1294)
 Juan Núñez II de Lara, fought for and against King Ferdinand IV of Castile, took the city of Gibraltar from the Moors
 Juan Núñez III de Lara, Lord of Lara and Biscay